Psychology of Aesthetics, Creativity, and the Arts is a quarterly peer-reviewed academic journal published by the American Psychological Association. The journal covers research on the psychology of the production and appreciation of the arts and all aspects of creative endeavor. The current editors-in-chief are Roni Reiter-Palmon and Pablo Tinio. The founding co-editors of the journal were Jeffrey Smith, Lisa Smith, and James C. Kaufman.

Abstracting and indexing 
The journal is abstracted and indexed in the Social Sciences Citation Index. According to the Journal Citation Reports, the journal has a 2020 impact factor of 4.349.

References

External links 
 

Psychology of creativity journals
American Psychological Association academic journals
Quarterly journals
English-language journals
Publications established in 2007